Clifford Raphael Young (August 2, 1964 – November 4, 1993) was an American professional baseball pitcher. He pitched parts of three seasons in Major League Baseball (MLB) between 1990 and 1993 for the California Angels (1990–91) and Cleveland Indians (1993). On May 21, 1993, Young picked up the only save of his abbreviated career in a 10-5 Indians win over the Tigers. Young went 3 shutout innings, closing out the win for starter Mike Bielecki. The Indians released him at the end of the 1993 season. Shortly thereafter, Young was killed in a traffic accident when the car he was driving went off the road and hit a tree, killing him instantly.

See also
 List of baseball players who died during their careers

References

External links
, or Retrosheet, or Pura Pelota (Venezuelan Winter League)

1964 births
1993 deaths
African-American baseball players
American expatriate baseball players in Canada
Baseball players from Texas
Calgary Expos players
California Angels players
Cardenales de Lara players
American expatriate baseball players in Venezuela
Charlotte Knights players
Cleveland Indians players
Edmonton Trappers players
Gastonia Expos players
Knoxville Blue Jays players
Major League Baseball pitchers
Road incident deaths in Texas
Syracuse Chiefs players
Tiburones de La Guaira players
West Palm Beach Expos players
People from Willis, Texas
20th-century African-American sportspeople